Jeonju Sports Complex Stadium (also Jeonju Civil Stadium) is a multi-purpose stadium in Jeonju, South Korea. It is currently used mostly for football matches. The stadium has a capacity of 30,000 people and was built in 1980. Jeonbuk Hyundai Motors used this stadium from 1995 to 2002.

External links
Jeonju Sports Facilities Management Center 
World Stadiums profile

Buildings and structures in Jeonju
Football venues in South Korea
Multi-purpose stadiums in South Korea
Athletics (track and field) venues in South Korea
Sports venues in North Jeolla Province
Sport in Jeonju
Sports venues completed in 1980
Jeonbuk Hyundai Motors
1980 establishments in South Korea
20th-century architecture in South Korea